Hűvösvölgy is a neighbourhood in the 2nd District of Budapest. The area is a popular hiking destination and is also an important transport hub. The suburb is known for its terminus of the Budapest Children's Railway.
A public transport terminus connects settlements north of the Buda (Nagykovácsi, Remeteszőlős, Solymár) with Buda city centre.

References 

Populated places in Hungary